Liggett Lake is a reservoir in Union County, Ohio created by the Liggett Lake Dam. It was built in 1968 by L. Liggett on private property.

References

Union County, Ohio